Semi-Silk is a 1925 German silent film directed by Richard Oswald and starring Bernd Aldor, Mary Parker and Valeska Stock.

The film's art direction was by Heinrich Richter.

Cast
 Bernd Aldor as Dr. Gonzales / Dr. Ranzau
 Mary Parker as Liane, Frau Gonzales
 Valeska Stock as Frau Weber
 Mary Kid as Kitty
 Bertl Byllardo as Rita, Kittys Tochter
 Karl Beckersachs as Kurt / Arthur von Hiller
 Hans Albers as Alex Bums / Pumm
 Kurt Gerron as Willi Krach, ein Ringer
 Fritz Kampers as Paul Körner / Hart, Ingenieur

References

Bibliography
 Hans-Michael Bock and Tim Bergfelder. The Concise Cinegraph: An Encyclopedia of German Cinema. Berghahn Books, 2009.

External links

1925 films
Films of the Weimar Republic
German silent feature films
Films directed by Richard Oswald
German black-and-white films
1920s German films